Slough Stadium originally known as the Dolphin Stadium was a greyhound racing stadium in Uxbridge Road, Slough, Berkshire.

Origins and opening
George Bennett Sr. a resident and entrepreneur of Slough bought and sold a cinema in Chalvey before purchasing the Dolphin Hotel in Slough in May 1914. The hotel was next door to the Dolphin ground which had hosted cricket, bowls and football in the nineteenth century. Slough Town AFC took over the ground in 1890 and Bennett became their owner.

Bennett decided that the ground required more activity and after watching the new sport of greyhound racing he made the decision to construct a greyhound track around the pitch. Work got underway in 1928 with the stadium taking shape on the east side of the Uxbridge Road and south of the Dolphin Hotel. The south part of the stadium would reach as far as the houses on Dolphin Road.

The opening night was on 26 May 1928 the first ever race at the track. Training kennels were established at the nearby Homelea Farm in Datchet.

Pre war history
In 1929 a greyhound called Idle Chief won 16 consecutive races and Bennett continued with his enterprises by introducing a training camp for boxers at his Dolphin hotel which included Tommy Farr, Ben Ford, Jack Doyle, Primo Carnera, Marcel Thil and Midget Wogan.

In 1936 Bennett sold the Dolphin Stadium to Clapton Stadium Company Limited who already controlled Clapton, South Shields and Warrington. H.Garland Wells who was joint vice president of the National Greyhound Racing Society and
Clapton Stadium Ltd was instrumental in the company’s decision to purchase the track which they renamed Slough Greyhound Stadium.

The track circumference was 400 yards and the course was described as a handy little track with bends that favour railers (greyhounds nearest the inside rail), a good run-up to the first bend means trap draw has little advantage. seeding did not exist which explains why trap draw had little advantage on a track favouring railers.

There was a training establishment at Sunnymeads, Dedworth in Windsor used solely for Slough greyhounds and principal events included the Easter Cup, Whitsun Cup, Yuletide Cup, Home Counties Cup and Coronation Puppy Championship with the addition of a race called the Dolphin Trophy.

1946-1960
After the war the Buckinghamshire Cup was introduced and totalisator turnover in 1946 was £1,495,881.

S.T.Lucas was the Racing Manager in the 1950s before handing over to John Collins in 1959, the Director of Racing for Clapton Stadium Ltd was E W Godfrey and he also handed over in 1959 to H J Richardson. E Luper and H Luper then took over as the new Managing Directors of the company.

1960s
In 1966 the Greyhound Racing Association (GRA) purchased New Clapton Stadiums Ltd, the deal included Slough, Clapton, Reading, two training sites with 180 acres and an interest in West Ham Stadium. Under the GRA the trainers responsible for supplying the greyhounds to Slough were Jimmy Jowett, Bill Krailing, Paddy Pierce, Jim Barker, Ron Jeffrey and Jim Sherry, the latter three also supplied Reading. Racing took place on Tuesday and Saturday evenings.

1970s
The hare system was an 'Inside Sumner' and amenities included a steak bar, two buffet bars and four licensed bars. In 1971 Slough and Reading changed to the contract trainer system, a policy that many stadia had adopted and three years later in 1974 sister track Clapton closed resulting in the prestigious Classic the Scurry Gold Cup being transferred to Slough.

The 1977 running of the Scurry ended with a three-way battle between two promising newcomers Wired To Moon and Cahurmore Speech and defending champion
Xmas Holiday. Cahurmore Speech broke the Slough track record in the semi-finals before finishing runner up to Wired To Moon in the final with Xmas Holiday finishing third. On the way back to the Northaw kennels after the race Adam Jackson's finalist Fiano was killed in a vehicle accident.

Trainer Ted Dickson won the first Classic race for the track after Greenfield Fox won the 1977 Laurels before winning the Pall Mall Stakes. Dickson also trained a fawn dog called Linacre who had four big wins in 1977, the Derby Consolation, Edinburgh Cup, Sussex Cup and Wembley Spring Cup. Dickson was rewarded by being named the Greyhound Trainer of the Year.

1980s
Yankee Express secured a hat-trick of Scurry titles in the early 1980s before Slough won the English Greyhound Derby with one of their greyhounds called Tico (trained by Arthur Hitch) in 1986.

Closure
In 1987 Slough became the fourth and last track of the 1966 deal to be sold by the GRA to developers. It closed on 21 March 1987 with the last race being won by Ted Dickson's Yellow Crest.

The Scurry Gold Cup moved to Catford and the original Sunnymeads kennels are still used today but the stadium site is a Sainsbury's supermarket.

Competitions

Scurry Gold Cup

Buckinghamshire Cup

Track records
Pre-metric
	
Post-metric

References

Defunct greyhound racing venues in the United Kingdom
Defunct sports venues in Berkshire
Sports venues completed in 1928
1928 establishments in England